Matykiewicz is a Polish surname. Notable people with the surname include:

 Bruno Matykiewicz (born 1959), Polish weightlifter
  (born 1946), Czech senator
 Tomáš Matykiewicz (born 1982), Czech weightlifter

Polish-language surnames